The Case of Richard Meynell is a novel by Mary Augusta Ward, first published in 1911.

Further reading
 Gwynn, Stephen (1917). "The Case of Richard Meynell." In: Mrs. Humphry Ward. London: Nisbet & Co., pp. 98–102.
 Vance, Norman (2012). " The Church in Danger: Mrs Humphry Ward's The Case of Richard Meynell," International Journal for the Study of the Christian Church, Vol. 12, No. 3/4, pp. 248–262.
 Wilt, Judith (2005). Behind Her Times: Transition England in the Novels of Mary Arnold Ward. Charlottesville, VA: University of Virginia Press.

External links
 The Case of Richard Meynell, at Internet Archive
 The Case of Richard Meynell, at Project Gutenberg
 The Case of Richard Meynell, at Hathi Trust

British philosophical novels
1911 British novels
Novels by Mary Augusta Ward